Nemanja Obradović (born 29 May 1989) is a Serbian professional footballer who plays as a forward for Mladost Lučani.

Career
This attacker has played for many clubs in his career. From Rad, in which he debuted, he spent time on loan in Macedonia (at Pobeda) and Bosnia and Herzegovina (at Drina Zvornik), as well as in the lower ranks of Serbia (at Srem and Proleter Novi Sad). In summer 2013, he joined Voždovac.

References

External links

 
 
 

1989 births
Footballers from Belgrade
Living people
Serbian footballers
Serbia under-21 international footballers
Association football midfielders
FK Rad players
FK Pobeda players
FK Palilulac Beograd players
FK Drina Zvornik players
FK Srem players
FK Proleter Novi Sad players
FK Voždovac players
PAE Kerkyra players
PAS Lamia 1964 players
Acharnaikos F.C. players
FK Čukarički players
FC Stal Kamianske players
FC Honka players
FK Spartak Subotica players
Kisvárda FC players
FK Inđija players
FK Neftchi Farg'ona players
Apollon Larissa F.C. players
FC Kyzylzhar players
FK Mladost Lučani players
Serbian First League players
Serbian SuperLiga players
Macedonian First Football League players
Premier League of Bosnia and Herzegovina players
Super League Greece players
Football League (Greece) players
Ukrainian Premier League players
Veikkausliiga players
Nemzeti Bajnokság I players
Kazakhstan Premier League players
Serbian expatriate footballers
Expatriate footballers in North Macedonia
Serbian expatriate sportspeople in North Macedonia
Expatriate footballers in Bosnia and Herzegovina
Serbian expatriate sportspeople in Bosnia and Herzegovina
Expatriate footballers in Greece
Serbian expatriate sportspeople in Greece
Expatriate footballers in Ukraine
Serbian expatriate sportspeople in Ukraine
Expatriate footballers in Finland
Serbian expatriate sportspeople in Finland
Expatriate footballers in Hungary
Serbian expatriate sportspeople in Hungary
Expatriate footballers in Uzbekistan
Serbian expatriate sportspeople in Uzbekistan
Expatriate footballers in Kazakhstan
Serbian expatriate sportspeople in Kazakhstan